Israel Meyer Augustine Jr. (16 November 192429 August 1994) was an American lawyer. Born in 1924, he was the first Black district judge in Louisiana.

In 1971, Augustine presided over a trial of twelve Black Panthers members accused of the attempted murder of five New Orleans policemen.

He died of amyotrophic lateral sclerosis in 1994.

References 

American lawyers
African-American judges
1924 births
1994 deaths
20th-century African-American people